The abbreviation NWI represents, among other things,
 N.W.I., the former Netherlands West Indies, aka Netherlands Antilles
 Newsworld International, cable TV news channel 
 Norwich Airport, IATA airport code
 National Wraparound Initiative
 North West Island, a coral cay in the southern Great Barrier Reef
 Northwest Industries Inc., aerospace company
 New World Interactive, video game company
 Northwest Indiana region
 The Times of Northwest Indiana